Diefenbacher is a German language surname. Notable people with the surname include:

Frank Diefenbacher (born 1982), German racing driver
Michel Diefenbacher (1947–2017), French politician

See also
Diefenbach (surname)
Dieffenbach (surname)

German-language surnames